The 1876 United States House of Representatives elections in Florida were held on November 7 for the 45th Congress.  These elections were held at the same time as the election for governor and the contentious presidential election, in which Florida was one of four states whose electoral votes were in dispute.

Background
In the 1874 elections, both Republican incumbents were initially declared re-elected.

Election results
Both incumbents ran for re-election, and both were defeated.  The 1st district changed from Republican to Democratic control while the 2nd changed from Democratic to Republican control, resulting in no net change

Contested election
As in 1874, Democrat Jesse J. Finley challenged the results of the election in the 2nd district. On February 20, 1879, Finley was declared the legitimate winner with a vote of 11,329 - 11,077, and was seated in Bisbee's place, serving from February 20, 1879 - March 3, 1879 when the 45th Congress ended.

See also
United States House of Representatives elections, 1876

References

1876
Florida
United States House of Representatives